Jorrit Croon (born 9 August 1998) is a Dutch field hockey player who plays as a midfielder or forward for Bloemendaal and the Dutch national team.

Club career
Croon started playing hockey at LSC Alecto. Since 2014 he has played for the first team of HGC, he made his debut at 16 years old. In 2016 Croon and his team finished third in the Hoofdklasse but were eliminated in the playoffs to win the national championship.  After 3 seasons with HGC, he transferred in the summer of 2018 to Bloemendaal. In his first season with Bloemendaal, he won his first Dutch national title by defeating Kampong in the championship final.

International career
After his great performances in the Hoofdklasse, Croon was called up for the national team to play in the 2016 Summer Olympics. At the 2017 EuroHockey Championship, where the Netherlands won the gold medal, Croon won the Under-21 Player of the Tournament award. He initially wasn't selected for the 2018 World Cup, but he replaced the injured Floris Wortelboer before the start of the tournament. He had to miss the 2019 EuroHockey Championship due to a shoulder injury he incurred during the 2019 FIH Pro League semi-finals.

Personal life
Croon is studying commercial economy at the Johan Cruyff University in Amsterdam.

Honours

Club
Bloemendaal
Hoofdklasse: 2018–19, 2020–21
Euro Hockey League: 2021

International
Netherlands
EuroHockey Championship: 2017,  2021

Career statistics

International

International goals
Scores and results list the Netherlands' goal tally first, score column indicates score after each Croon goal.

References

External links

 

1998 births
Living people
People from Leiderdorp
Dutch male field hockey players
Male field hockey midfielders
Male field hockey forwards
Field hockey players at the 2016 Summer Olympics
2018 Men's Hockey World Cup players
Field hockey players at the 2020 Summer Olympics
Olympic field hockey players of the Netherlands
HGC players
HC Bloemendaal players
Men's Hoofdklasse Hockey players
Sportspeople from South Holland
2023 Men's FIH Hockey World Cup players